Five ships of the Royal Navy have been named HMS Hebe, after the Greek goddess Hebe.

  was a French 38-gun frigate captured in 1782, renamed Blonde in 1805, and broken up in 1811.
  was a 32-gun fifth rate in service from 1804 to 1813. Because Hebe served in the navy's Egyptian campaign (8 March to 8 September 1801), her officers and crew qualified for the clasp "Egypt" to the Naval General Service Medal, which the Admiralty issued in 1847 to all surviving claimants. 
  was a 46-gun  launched in 1826, made a receiving ship in 1839, hulked in 1861, and broken up 1873.
  was an  launched in 1892, converted to a minesweeper in 1909, and sold 1919.
  was a  launched in 1936 and sunk by a mine off Bari in November 1943.

See also
 was launched at Leith. For eight years she served the Royal Navy as a hired armed ship and transport. Her contract lasted from 27 April 1804 to 30 October 1812. She spent her entire naval career escorting convoys to the Baltic. She became a transport that an American privateer captured in March 1814.

Notes, citations, and references
Notes

Citations

References

Royal Navy ship names